Chen Yuefang (1 May 1963 – 18 September 2000) was a Chinese basketball player who competed in the 1984 Summer Olympics. At , she was one of the tallest female Chinese basketball players ever, but cerebral thrombosis and anemia forced her to retire in 1985 at the age of 22. She died at the age of 37.

References

1963 births
2000 deaths
Chinese women's basketball players
Basketball players from Ningxia
Basketball players at the 1984 Summer Olympics
Medalists at the 1984 Summer Olympics
Olympic basketball players of China
Olympic bronze medalists for China
Olympic medalists in basketball
Basketball players at the 1982 Asian Games
Asian Games medalists in basketball
Asian Games gold medalists for China
Medalists at the 1982 Asian Games
20th-century Chinese women